Kolokope Airport  is an airport serving Anié, located in the Plateaux region in Togo.

Facilities

References

External links
 

Airports in Togo
Plateaux Region, Togo